Dilum is a Sri Lankan male given name. Notable people with this name include:

 Dilum Amunugama, Sri Lankan politician
 Dilum Fernando (born 1994), Sri Lankan cricket player
 Dilum Weerarathne (born 1996), Sri Lankan cricket player
 Dilum Meegoda, American-Sri Lankan Businessman

Sinhalese masculine given names